Kite Museum may refer to:

 Kite Museum (Johor) in Johor, Malaysia
 Kite Museum (Malacca) in Malacca, Malaysia
 Patang Kite Museum at Sanskar Kendra, Ahmedabad, India
 Kites Museum of Indonesia, a museum in Pondok Labu, South Jakarta